In Islam, a  (plural:), meaning "renunciate", is someone who maintains the pure monotheism of the patriarch Abraham.

Etymology and history of the term
The term  comes from the Arabic root  meaning "to incline, to decline" or "to turn or bend sideways" from the Syriac root of the same meaning. It is defined as "true believer, orthodox; one who scorns the false creeds surrounding him/her and profess the true religion" by The Arabic-English Dictionary of Modern Written Arabic.

According to Francis Edward Peters, in verse  of the Quran it has been translated as "upright person" and outside the Quran as "to incline towards a right state or tendency". According to W. Montgomery Watt, it appears to have been used earlier by Jews and Christians in reference to "pagans" and applied to followers of an old Hellenized Syrian and Arabian religion and used to taunt early Muslims.

Michael Cook states "its exact sense is obscure" but the Quran "uses it in contexts suggestive of a pristine monotheism, which it tends to contrast with (latter-day) Judaism and Christianity". In the Quran  is associated "strongly with Abraham, but never with Moses or Jesus".

Oxford Islamic Studies online defines  as "one who is utterly upright in all of his or her affairs, as exemplified by the model of Abraham"; and that prior to the arrival of Islam "the term was used [...] to designate pious people who accepted monotheism but did not join the Jewish or Christian communities."

Others translate   as the law of Ibrahim; the verb  as "to turn away from [idolatry]".

List of 

According to the Encyclopædia Britannica, "some of Muḥammad's relatives, contemporaries, and early supporters were called " – examples including Waraqah ibn Nawfal, "a cousin of the Prophet’s first wife, Khadija bint Khuwaylid, and Umayyah ibn Abī aṣ-Ṣalt, "an early 7th-century Arab poet".

According to the website "In the Name of Allah", the term  is used "twelve times in the Quran", but Abraham/Ibrahim is "the only person to have been explicitly identified with the term." He is mentioned "in reference to"  eight times in the Quran.

Among those who, pre traditional Islamic belief, are thought to be  are:

All the prophets and messengers after Abraham
Old Najranites
Seven Sleepers
Sa'id bin Zayd
Khaled bin Sinan
Hashim ibn Abd Manaf 

The four friends in Mecca from ibn Ishaq's account:

Zayd ibn Amr: rejected both Judaism and Christianity
Waraqah ibn Nawfal: was an Nestorian priest and patrilineal third cousin to Muhammad. He died before Muhammad declared his Prophethood.
Uthman ibn al-Huwayrith: travelled to the Byzantine Empire and converted to Christianity
Ubayd-Allah ibn Jahsh: early Muslim convert who emigrated to the Kingdom of Aksum and then converted to Christianity.

 opponents of Islam from Ibn Isḥāq's account:

Abū 'Amar 'Abd Amr ibn Sayfī: a leader of the tribe of Banu Aws at Medina and builder of the "Mosque of the Schism" mentioned in the Quranic verse  and later allied with the Quraysh then moved to Ta'if and onto Syria after subsequent early Muslim conquests.
Abu Qays ibn al-Aslaṭ

Historicity
According to the Encyclopædia Britannica, "there is no evidence that a true  cult existed in pre-Islāmic Arabia".

A Greek source from the fifth century CE, The Ecclesiastical History of Sozomen, speaks of how "Abraham had bequeathed a monotheist religion" to Arabs, that the Arabs descended "from Ishmael and Hagar" and followed Jewish practices such as not eating pork. No archaeological evidence has been found to support the idea that Abraham was a real person, and most scholars do not consider the Book of Genesis to be an accurate history.

Sozomen was a historian of the Christian Church who is thought to have been a native of Gaza whose native tongue was Arabic and who lived from about 400-450 CE. Thus according to Ibn Rawandi, he provides a "reliable source" that Arabs – at least in northwest Arabia – were familiar with the idea there were pre-Islamic "Abrahamic monotheists [...] whether this was true of Arabs throughout the [Arabian] peninsula it is impossible to say".

See also
Banu Khuza'a
Noahidism, similar concept with Judaism
Abrahamites
Perennial Philosophy
People of the Book
Prisca theologia, equivalent concept in esoteric Christianity
Rahmanism
Urmonotheismus

Notes

References 
 

 

 
 
 
 

Quranic words and phrases
Islamic terminology